The 1975 World Table Tennis Championships – Corbillon Cup (women's team) was the 26th edition of the women's team championship.

China won the gold medal, South Korea won the silver medal and Japan won the bronze medal.

Medalists

Final tables

Group A

Group B

Semifinals

Third-place playoff

Final

See also
List of World Table Tennis Championships medalists

References

-
1975 in women's table tennis